Walter McCanless House, also known as the Hedrick House and Donaldson House, is a historic home located at Salisbury, Rowan County, North Carolina.  It was designed by architecture firm Benton & Benton and built between 1927 and 1929.  It is a large two-story, buff brick and terra cotta, Renaissance style mansion. It consists of a two-story main block with flanking single-story pavilions, and two symmetrical two-story rear ells project to give the home a "U"-shaped plan. Other contributing resources are the garage (c. 1929) and swimming pool (c. 1929).

It was listed on the National Register of Historic Places in 2005.

References

Houses on the National Register of Historic Places in North Carolina
Renaissance Revival architecture in North Carolina
Houses completed in 1929
Houses in Salisbury, North Carolina
National Register of Historic Places in Rowan County, North Carolina